Węgierki  is a village in the administrative district of Gmina Września, within Września County, Greater Poland Voivodeship, in west-central Poland.

Monuments 
 Church of the Sacred Heart of Jesus, Węgierki
 Węgierki Palace

References 

Villages in Września County